Alexander Munro (30 November 1870 – 3 January 1934) was a British strongman, wrestler, and tug of war competitor who competed in the latter sport in the 1908 Summer Olympics and in the 1912 Summer Olympics.

In 1908 he won the bronze medal as member of the British team Metropolitan Police "K" Division. Four years later he won the silver medal as member of the joint City of London Police-Metropolitan Police "K" Division British team. In 1908, Munro was also the Scottish wrestling champion, but lost a noted match to Georg Hackenschmidt.

Notes and references

External links
Alexander Munro's profile at databaseOlympics
Alexander Munro's profile at Sports Reference.com

1870 births
1934 deaths
Metropolitan Police officers
Olympic tug of war competitors of Great Britain
Tug of war competitors at the 1908 Summer Olympics
Tug of war competitors at the 1912 Summer Olympics
Olympic silver medallists for Great Britain
Olympic bronze medallists for Great Britain
Olympic medalists in tug of war
Medalists at the 1912 Summer Olympics
Medalists at the 1908 Summer Olympics